The Nigerian National Assembly delegation from Niger State comprises three Senators and nine Representatives.

6th Assembly (2007–2011)

The 6th National Assembly (2007–2011) was inaugurated on 5 June 2007.
The People's Democratic Party (PDP) won three Senate and six House seats.
The All Nigeria Peoples Party (ANPP) won three House seats.

Senators representing Niger State in the 6th Assembly were:

Representatives in the 6th Assembly were:

8th Assembly (2015–2019) 

Representative in the 8th assembly.

9th Assembly (2019–2023) 

Representatives in the 9th Assembly.

See also
Senate of Nigeria
Nigerian National Assembly

References

Politics of Niger State
National Assembly (Nigeria) delegations by state